The 1915 Geneva Covenanters football team was an American football team that represented Geneva College as an independent during the 1915 college football season. Led by third-year head coach C. Brainerd Metheny, the team compiled a record of 6–3.

Schedule

References

Geneva
Geneva Golden Tornadoes football seasons
Geneva Covenanters football